The Virginian Railway's class EL-2B comprised four two-unit electric locomotives with AAR (B+B-B+B)+(B+B-B+B) wheel arrangements. The locomotives were used on the  electrified portion of the railroad, from Roanoke, Virginia to Mullens, West Virginia.

The EL-2B locomotives were built at General Electric's Erie works in 1948. Numbered 125–128, they were the largest two-unit electric locomotives used in North America.

The locomotives were retired and sold for scrap shortly after the 1959 merger of the Virginian with the Norfolk and Western Railway. None of the 4 examples built survived into preservation.

References

11 kV AC locomotives
Virginian Railway locomotives
General Electric locomotives
B+B-B+B locomotives
Electric locomotives of the United States
Scrapped locomotives
Freight locomotives
Standard gauge locomotives of the United States
Railway locomotives introduced in 1948
Streamlined electric locomotives